was a Japanese professional baseball pitcher. In 1957, he won 20 consecutive games. In 1958 Japan Series, he pitched six games and won 4 consecutive games after his team lost 3 games. He even hit a home run in fifth game of Japan Series. He was the Pacific League's Most Valuable Player in 1957 and 1958. He had 42 wins in 1961. Fans called his great success "God, Buddha, Inao".

In 1964, he injured his shoulder, and in 1965 came back to full-time pitching, mainly in relief. He retired as a player in 1969, and went on to manage the Nishitetsu Lions from 1970 to 1974.

He was inducted into the Japanese Baseball Hall of Fame in 1993. His number 24 was retired by the Saitama Seibu Lions on April 30, 2012.

Career statistics 

Bolded figures are league-leading

Titles and Award
Rookie of the Year : (1956)
Wins Champion : 4 times (1957,1958,1961,1963)
Winning Percentage Champion: 2 times (1957,1961)
ERA Champion : 5 times (1956–1958,1961,1966)
Strikeout Champion : 3 times (1958,1961,1963)
MVP : 2 times (1957–1958)
Best Nine : 5 times (1957–1958,1961–1963)

Record
42 Wins (1961) (National Record, tied)
20 consecutive wins (1957) (National Record)
78 Games Played (1961) (Pacific League Record)
1.06 ERA (1956) (Pacific League Record, National Rookie-Year Record)
404 inning Pitched (1961) (Pacific League Record)
11 wins in single month (Aug, 1956) (National Record)
4 complete game in single Japan Series (1958) (Japan Series Record, tied)
4 wins in single Japan Series (1958) (Japan Series Record, tied)
11 career wins in Japan Series (tied with Tsuneo Horiuchi)

References

External links

1937 births
2007 deaths
Baseball people from Ōita Prefecture
Japanese baseball players
Nippon Professional Baseball pitchers
Nishitetsu Lions players
Nippon Professional Baseball Rookie of the Year Award winners
Nippon Professional Baseball MVP Award winners
Managers of baseball teams in Japan
Seibu Lions managers
Chiba Lotte Marines managers
Deaths from cancer in Japan

Japanese Baseball Hall of Fame inductees